Gaurishankar Bhattacharyya (10 December 1915 - ?) was an Assamese communist politician, who served as the Leader of Opposition in the Assam Legislative Assembly.

Early life and education 
Bhattacharya was born in Samarkuchi village of Nalbari district to Souridutta Bhattacharyya, a Sanskrit Pandit. He did his undergraduate from Cotton College, and earned a M. A. in history from Presidency College, Kolkata.

Political career 
Bhattacharya was active in Communist politics since his student days; in 1939, he was elected as the president of the All Assam Students Federation. During the Partition, Bhattacharya campaigned for an independent nation-state of Assam. 

In 1952, Bhattacharya won election to the Assam Legislative Assembly from the Guwahati constituency for the Communist Party of India (CPI) barely scraping past Rajabala Das of the Indian National Congress (INC). He was the only legislator from CPI in the House. In 1957, he defended the seat, defeating Lakshmidhar Barah of the INC. However, five years later in 1962, Bhattacharya suffered a heavy defeat at the hands of Debendra Nath Sharma, the INC candidate. Months afterward, during the Sino-Indian War, Bhattacharya was subject to preventive detention for alleged sympathies to China; he would leave CPI, shortly.  

In the 1967 elections, Bhattacharya stood as an independent candidate from the newly delimited Borbhag constituency and eked out a comfortable win over Pabindra Nath Sarma of the INC. Two years later, Bhattacharya collaborated with Renuka Devi Barkataki, a Congress renegade, to launch the Peoples Democratic Party of Assam (PDPA); it would be the first regional party to contest the assembly elections. Five years later, Bhattacharya stood as an independent candiddate from Borhat again, and won against Sarma but the margin decreased. PDPA commanded negligible influence and merged with Janata Party in 1977.

Literature 
Bhattacharya moved away from politics in his later life, devoting time to literature; in 1999, he was conferred with the Anubad Suchi Samman by the Sahitya Akademi for translating B.R. Aggarwalla's Trials of Independence into Assamese.

Personal life 
Bhattacharya married Tarulata Sen; they had two sons — Dhruba Shankar Bhattacharya and Siddhartha Bhattacharya —, and a daughter — Suprabha Bhattacharya. Siddhartha Bhattacharya is a legislator from the Bharatiya Janata Party; Suprabha Bhattacharya's only son is Arnab Goswami, an Indian right-wing news anchor.

Notes

References 

Assam MLAs 1957–1962
Assam MLAs 1952–1957